The Cuba women's national field hockey team represents Cuba in women's international field hockey competitions.

Tournament History

Pan American Games
 1991 - 6th place
 1995 – 4th place
 1999 – 5th place
 2007 – 6th place
 2011 – 5th place
 2015 – 8th place
 2019 – 8th place

Central American and Caribbean Games
 1986 – 5th place
 1990 – 4th place
 1993 – 
 1998 – 
 2006 – 
 2014 – 
 2018 – 
 2023 – Qualified

See also
 Cuba men's national field hockey team

References

Americas women's national field hockey teams
Field Hockey
National team